WJSQ (101.7 FM, "Music America Loves") is a radio station broadcasting a country music format. Licensed to Athens, Tennessee, United States, the station is currently owned by Randall W. Sliger, and features programming from Citadel Media and Motor Racing Network.

References

External links
 

Country radio stations in the United States
JSQ
McMinn County, Tennessee